"Baby Mine" is a song from the 1941 Disney animated feature Dumbo. The music is by Frank Churchill, with lyrics by Ned Washington. Betty Noyes recorded the vocals for the original film version.  In the film, Dumbo's mother, Mrs. Jumbo, an elephant locked in a circus wagon, cradles her baby Dumbo with her trunk while this lullaby is sung. It is also the last appearance of the circus animals.

The song was nominated for an Academy Award for Best Original Song at the 14th Academy Awards in 1942.  It is also listed on AFI's "100 Years... 100 Songs" as one of America's greatest film songs.

Recordings
Early popular recordings include those by Les Brown, Glenn Miller, and Jane Froman, followed by several others; and decades later, the song regained attention. 
Bette Midler covered the song on the 1988 Beaches soundtrack. In the same year, Bonnie Raitt and Was (Not Was) recorded the song for the album, Stay Awake: Various Interpretations of Music from Vintage Disney Films.

Alison Krauss recorded the song for the 1996 album The Best of Country Sing the Best of Disney. Her version peaked at number 82 on the RPM Country Tracks chart in Canada. Krauss' cover earned her a Grammy nomination for Best Female Country Vocal Performance in 1997.

Soap actress Kassie DePaiva recorded the song with Jim Brickman for The Disney Songbook.

An instrumental version by violinist Jenny Oaks Baker was included in the Grammy-nominated album Wish Upon a Star, released in 2011.

Brian Wilson recorded his own arrangement of "Baby Mine" on his In the Key of Disney Disney cover album in 2011.

There have been numerous Disney compilation releases of the original, as well as an Original Cast recording from the musical, Disney's On the Record: A New Musical Review

The song is used recurrently in the AMC television drama Halt and Catch Fire as a lullaby that Donna Clark (Kerry Bishé) sings to her daughters.

Sharon Rooney and Arcade Fire covered the song for the 2018-2019 live-action remake of Dumbo, while Norwegian singer Aurora performed the song for the trailer.

The song also features in the 2019 Netflix sci-fi drama I Am Mother, sung by Clara Rugaard and later by Nina Ferro.

References
Notes

Sources

Disney songs
1941 songs
Dumbo
Songs about elephants
Songs written for animated films
Songs with lyrics by Ned Washington
Songs with music by Frank Churchill
Alison Krauss songs
Bette Midler songs
Brian Wilson songs
Kenny Loggins songs
Songs about parenthood
Lullabies
Walt Disney Records singles